The lesser green leafbird (Chloropsis cyanopogon) is a species of bird in the family Chloropseidae.
It is found in Brunei, Indonesia, Malaysia, Myanmar, Singapore, and Thailand.
Its natural habitat is subtropical or tropical moist lowland forest.
It is threatened by habitat loss.

References

lesser green leafbird
Birds of Malesia
lesser green leafbird
Taxonomy articles created by Polbot
Taxa named by Coenraad Jacob Temminck